Tieshan is a town in Dazu District, Chongqing province, China. , it administers the following two residential communities and twelve villages:
Shuanghe Street Community
Jinyuan Street Community
Shuangqiao Village
Youfang Village
Lianke Village
Xibei Village
Jiguang Village
Qilin Village
Duobao Village
Gaolong Village
Jianjiao Village
Guixiang Village
Sanzhai Village
Shengfeng Village

References

Township-level divisions of Chongqing